Sibutad, officially the Municipality of Sibutad (Subanen: Benwa Sibutad; Chavacano: Municipalidad de Sibutad), is a 5th class municipality in the province of Zamboanga del Norte, Philippines. According to the 2020 census, it has a population of 17,453 people.

Geography

Barangays

Sibutad is politically subdivided into 16 barangays.

Climate

Demographics

Economy

Education
Sibutad has 15 schools, 13 of which are complete elementary schools and 2 are primary schools. All are in the Sibutad School District. Schools are:

Secondary schools of Sibutad:

Notable personalities

Most Rev. Severo Caermare, D.D. (b. 1969) - bishop of Dipolog

References

External links
 Sibutad Profile at PhilAtlas.com
 [ Philippine Standard Geographic Code]
Philippine Census Information

Municipalities of Zamboanga del Norte